Hermann Stiller (29 November 1850 – 1931) was a German architect and director of the Kunstgewerbeschule Düsseldorf.

Life 
Born Gostyń, Stiller studied at the Bauakademie and was there, among other things, a pupil of Friedrich Adler. He received the State Prize of the Academy in 1875 – presumably for his Entwurf zu einer Kunst-Academie. He used the associated bonus for a study trip to Italy in 1876/77. Between 1878 and 1880, he worked under Wilhelm von Mörner on the planning and execution of the new building for the Reichsjustizamt in Berlin, Voßstraße 4/5. In 1882, he became director of the Kunsthochschule Kassel, and from 1884 to 1903, he was the first director of the newly founded Kunstgewerbeschule Düsseldorf. He then settled in Cologne as an independent architect.

Stiller was a member of the Architekten- und Ingenieurverein Düsseldorf, where he served as chairman in 1893 and at times served as Vice-Chairman. After moving to Cologne, he transferred to the local Architekten und Ingenieur-Verein für Niederrhein und Westfalen. He became a member of the Bund Deutscher Architekten (BDA), and the local group of the BDA in Cologne later appointed him an honorary member.

Stiller was married to Erminia née Bumiller. Their common daughter Maria married the composer and conductor Rudolf Siegel and was the mother of the composer .

Work

Buildings and drafts 
His constructions include various buildings for Reichsbank branches, especially in the Rhine Province:
 1892–1894: , Heinrich-Heine-Allee 8/9
 1896–1897: Reichsbank-Stelle Mülheim, Kaiserstraße 20
 1897: Reichsbank-Stelle Duisburg, Düsseldorfer Straße 21.
 1900–1902: Reichsbank-Nebenstelle Uerdingen, Niederstraße 24
 1902–1904: Reichsbank-Nebenstelle Barmen, Neuer Weg 594/596
 1903–1905: Reichsbank-Nebenstelle Viersen, Poststraße 8
 1904–1906: Reichsbank-Stelle Krefeld, Friedrichsplatz 20
 1905–1907: Reichsbank-Nebenstelle Rüdesheim, Geisenheimer Straße 17
 1908–1910: Reichsbank-Nebenstelle Kleve, Klosterstraße 12/14
 1909–1910: Reichsbank-Nebenstelle Moers, Landwehrstraße 6
 1910–1911: Reichsbank-Nebenstelle Mettmann, Bahnstraße 55

Beyond his work for the Reichsbank, other bank buildings by Stiller are known to date.
 1895: Competition design for the Ruhmeshalle in Barmen (motto "Hya Berge romeryke", awarded with a 3rd prize)
 1901–1902: Bank building for the Bergisch-Märkische Bank AG in Krefeld, Ostwall 131–135 (today Deutsche Bank).
 1910–1912: Bankgebäude für die Kreissparkasse Moers, Goethestraße (with ).

Publications 
 
 Das Traianeum. (Altertümer von Pergamon. Vol. 5, 2.) de Gruyter, Berlin 1895 (uni-heidelberg.de).

References

Further reading 
 Stiller, Hermann. In Hans Vollmer (ed.): Allgemeines Lexikon der Bildenden Künstler von der Antike bis zur Gegenwart. Created by Ulrich Thieme and Felix Becker. Vol. 32: Stephens–Theodotos. E. A. Seemann, Leipzig 1938,  (Is also referred here as a pupil of Hugo Licht).
 Hans-Peter Schwanke: Baumeister aus Leidenschaft und die Renaissance zum Vorbild. Leben und Werk des Architekten Hermann Stiller unter besonderer Berücksichtigung seiner Krefelder Bauten. In Die Heimat. Krefelder Jahrbuch. 67, 1996, .

External links 
 Works by Hermann Stiller in the inventory of the 

19th-century German architects
20th-century German architects
1850 births
1931 deaths
People from Gostyń